Deborah "Debbie" Van Kiekebelt (born March 1, 1954 in Kitchener, Ontario) is a Canadian athlete and sports broadcaster. She was a gold medallist in the pentathlon at the 1971 Pan American Games, and was named that year's Canadian Woman Athlete of the year. Later, she became Canada's first female sports broadcaster.

Van Kiekebelt attended Clarkson Secondary School in Mississauga, Ontario. During her high school days at Clarkson, she not only captured many Peel regional titles, but set records in several events.

After her Pan-Am gold medal win in Cali, Colombia in the pentathlon, She competed in the Long Jump and Pentathlon at the 1972 Olympic games in Munich. Where she failed to advance to final in the long jump, and place 15th in the Pentathlon. She won a silver medal in the high jump at the 1973 Pacific Conference Games; she was appointed to the Mississauga Sports Hall of Fame in 1977. She became the first female Canadian sports broadcaster, appearing on Citytv and NBC, and was host of six television series.

Van Kiekebelt was a director for the See You In Athens Fund which supported Canadian athletes attending the 2004 Summer Olympics.

References

1954 births
Living people
Canadian sportswomen
Canadian television hosts
Citytv people
Canadian heptathletes
Canadian pentathletes
Sportspeople from Kitchener, Ontario
Track and field athletes from Ontario
Olympic track and field athletes of Canada
Athletes (track and field) at the 1972 Summer Olympics
Pan American Games gold medalists for Canada
Pan American Games medalists in athletics (track and field)
Athletes (track and field) at the 1971 Pan American Games
Commonwealth Games competitors for Canada
Athletes (track and field) at the 1970 British Commonwealth Games
Canadian people of Dutch descent
Canadian women television hosts
Medalists at the 1971 Pan American Games